Alexei Alexandrovich Kudin (born December 20, 1984) is a professional Belarusian kickboxer, nicknamed Brick. He is a world champion and European versions WBKF, King of Kings – Grand Prix K-1 tournament finalist, which was held December 16, 2010, in Odintsovo. 
In addition to competition in kickboxing, Alexei Kudin had many professional fights in mixed martial arts.

Career
Kudin faced Chaban Ka on April 9, 2013, in a quarter finals match of the 2013 M-1 Grand Prix and lost the fight in first round by Rear-Naked Choke.

Titles

Kickboxing
Professional
King of Kings 
2010 KOK World GP 2010 in Moscow runner up
World Bars Kickboxing Federation
2008 WBKF European Super Heavyweight tournament runner up (+93 kg)
2008 WBKF World Super Heavyweight tournament runner up (+93 kg)
2007 WBKF World Super Heavyweight champion (+93 kg)

Amateur
2013 WAKO world championship  +91 kg (K-1 rules)
2010 WAKO European championship  +91 kg (K-1 rules)
2009 WAKO world championship  +91 kg
2008 WAKO European championship  +91 kg (K-1 rules)
2007 WAKO world championship  +91 kg
2006 WAKO European championship  +91 kg (Thai-Boxing rules)
2004 WAKO European championship  -91 kg (K-1 rules)

Muaythai
Amateur
2012 IFMA European championship  +91 kg
2011 IFMA world championship  +91 kg
2010 IFMA world championship  +91 kg
2008 IFMA world championship  +91 kg
2007 IFMA world championship  +91 kg
2006 IFMA world championship  +91 kg
2006 WMF world championship  +91 kg

MMA
Russian MMA Union
2012 Russian MMA Championship tournament champion (+93 kg)
Professional Fighting Championships (ProFC)
2011 ProFC Grand Prix champion (+93 kg)

Mixed martial arts record

|-
| Win
| align=center| 26–12–1 (1)
| Evgeniy Bova
| TKO 
| NFG 13: Tempest from the East
| 
| align=center|1
| align=center|2:35
| Minsk, Belarus
|
|-
| Win
| align=center| 25–12–1 (1)
| Dmitriy Isachenko
| Submission (choke) 
| EEF - Roscongress Vladivostok Combat Night
| 
| align=center|1
| align=center|
| Vladivostok, Russia
|
|-
| Loss
| align=center| 24–12–1 (1)
| Anatoliy Malykhin 
| TKO (punches)
| Fight Nights Global 93: Mytyshchi Cup
| 
| align=center|2
| align=center|3:32
| Moscow, Russia
| 
|-
| NC
| align=center| 24–11–1 (1)
| Chaban Ka
| NC (illegal strike)
| 100% Fight 38
| 
| align=center|1
| align=center|
| Paris, France
|
|-
| Win
| align=center| 24–11–1
| Cody East
| TKO (retirement)
| Fight Nights Global: Summer Cup 2018
| 
| align=center|5
| align=center| 
| Bozhou, China
|
|-
| Loss
| align=center| 23–11–1
| Viktor Pešta
| Submission (rear-naked choke)
| Fight Nights Global 79: Pavlovich vs. Sidelnikov
| 
| align=center|1
| align=center|4:52
| Penza, Russia
| 
|-
| Win
| align=center| 23–10–1
| Charles Andrade
| Decision (unanimous)
| Academy MMA Minsk – Academy MMA Cup 2017
| 
| align=center|3
| align=center|5:00
| Minsk, Belarus
|
|-
| Win
| align=center| 22–10–1
| Derrick Mehmen
| Decision (split)
| Fight Nights Global 64: Nam vs. Bagautinov
| 
| align=center|3
| align=center|5:00
| Moscow, Russia
|
|-
| Loss
| align=center| 21–10–1
| Sergei Pavlovich
| Decision (unanimous)
| Fight Nights Global 54: Pavlovich vs. Kudin
| 
| align=center|3
| align=center|5:00
| Rostov-on-Don, Russia
| 
|-
| Draw
| align=center| 21–9-1
| Mikhail Mokhnatkin
| Draw
| Fight Nights Global 46: Mokhnatkin vs. Kudin
| 
| align=center|3
| align=center|5:00
| Krylatskoe, Russia
| 
|-
| Win
| align=center| 21–9
| Evgeni Boldyrev
| KO (punches)
| Mix Fight Combat
| 
| align=center|1
| align=center|4:51
| Khimki, Russia
| 
|-
| Loss
| align=center| 20–9
| Jeremy May
| Submission (armbar)
| M-1 Global – Way to M-1 China
| 
| align=center|1
| align=center|  
| Chengdu, China
| 
|-
| Win
| align=center| 20–8
| Baga Agaev
| TKO (leg kicks)
| M-1 Challenge 58 – Battle in the Mountains 4
| 
| align=center|2
| align=center|1:40
| Ingushetia, Russia
| 
|-
| Loss
| align=center| 19–8
| Alexander Volkov
| Decision (unanimous)
| Union MMA Pro
| 
| align=center|3
| align=center|5:00
| Krasnodar, Russia
| 
|-
| Win
| align=center| 19–7
| Travis Fulton
| TKO (punches)
| Russian MMA Union – New Horizons Grand Final
| 
| align=center|1
| align=center|1:34
| Minsk, Belarus
| 
|-
| Win
| align=center| 18–7
| Andreas Kraniotakes
| KO (punch)
| ProFC 55: Kudin vs. Kraniotakes
| 
| align=center|1
| align=center|4:23
| Krasnodar, Russia
| 
|-
| Loss
| align=center| 17–7
| Sergei Kharitonov
| TKO (punches)
| M-1 Challenge 43
| 
| align=center|2
| align=center|4:52
| Surgut, Russia
| 
|-
| Win
| align=center| 17–6
| Vladimir Mishchenko
| TKO (retirement)
| OC – Oplot Challenge 67
| 
| align=center|1
| align=center|5:00
| Kharkov, Ukraine
| 
|-
| Win
| align=center| 16–6
| Vladimir Nepochatov
| KO (punch)
| NC – Neman Challenge
| 
| align=center|1
| align=center|0:23
| Grodno, Belarus
| 
|-
| Win
| align=center| 15–6
| Dritan Bajramaj
| KO (punch)
| M-1 Challenge 39
| 
| align=center|1
| align=center|1:17
| Moscow, Russia
| 
|-
| Loss
| align=center| 14–6
| Chaban Ka
| Submission (rear-naked choke)
| M-1 Challenge 38: Spring Battle
| 
| align=center|1
| align=center|4:06
| St. Petersburg, Russia
| M-1 Grand Prix: Quarter Finals
|-
| Loss
| align=center| 14–5 
| Mike Wessel
| Decision (unanimous)
| Bellator 83
| 
| align=center|3
| align=center|5:00
| Atlantic City, New Jersey, United States
| 
|-
| Win
| align=center| 14–4 
| Konstantin Gluhov
| Decision (unanimous)
| RMMAC – Russian MMA Championship
| 
| align=center|2
| align=center|5:00
| St.Petersburg, Russia
| Wins Russian MMA Championship tournament.
|-
| Win
| align=center| 13–4 
| Tadas Rimkevicius
| TKO (doctor stoppage)
| RMMAC – Russian MMA Championship
| 
| align=center|1
| align=center|
| St.Petersburg, Russia
| Semi finals.
|-
| Win
| align=center| 12–4 
| Oleg Tinins
| TKO (punches)
| RMMAC – Russian MMA Championship
| 
| align=center|1
| align=center|
| St.Petersburg, Russia
| Quarter finals.
|-
| Win
| align=center| 11–4 
| Evgeniy Denschikov
| KO (punch)
| V – Vosmiugolnik
| 
| align=center|1
| align=center|
| Minsk, Belarus
| 
|-
| Win
| align=center| 10–4 
| Vladimir Kuchenko
| TKO (leg kicks)
| Lion's Fights 1 – The Beginning
| 
| align=center|1
| align=center|2:32
| St.Petersburg, Russia
| 
|-
| Loss
| align=center| 9–4 
| Magomed Abdurahimov
| Decision (split)
| WUFC – Challenge of Champions
| 
| align=center|3
| align=center|5:00
| Makhachkala, Russia
| Final.
|-
| Win
| align=center| 9–3 
| Konstantin Gluhov
| Decision (unanimous)
| WUFC – Challenge of Champions
| 
| align=center|2
| align=center|5:00
| Makhachkala, Russia
| Semi finals.
|-
| Win
| align=center| 8–3 
| Kazbek Saidaliev
| KO (punch)
| ProFC – Grand Prix Global Finals
| 
| align=center|1
| align=center|2:22
| Rostov-on-Don, Russia
| 
|-
| Win
| align=center| 7–3 
| Dmitry Poberezhets
| TKO (punches)
| ProFC – Grand Prix Global Finals
| 
| align=center|3
| align=center|3:39
| Rostov-on-Don, Russia
| 
|-
| Win
| align=center| 6–3 
| Semion Borsh
| TKO (punches)
| ProFC Grand Prix Global – East Europe
| 
| align=center|1
| align=center|0:48
| Kishinev, Moldova
| Wins ProFC Grand Prix.
|-
| Win
| align=center| 5–3 
| Wojciech Bulinski
| KO (punch)
| ProFC Grand Prix Global – East Europe
| 
| align=center|1
| align=center|0:07
| Kishinev, Moldova
| Semi finals.
|-
|-
| Win
| align=center| 4–3 
| Dmitry Poberezhets
| Decision (unanimous)
| ProFC – Union Nation Cup Final
| 
| align=center|2
| align=center|5:00
| Rostov-on-Don, Russia
| 
|-
| Win
| align=center| 3–3 
| Vitaly Operit
| TKO (punches)
| RF – Real Fight-FC
| 
| align=center|1
| align=center|2:00
| Minsk, Belarus
| 
|-
| Win
| align=center| 2–3 
| Denis Ivanets
| Submission (punches)
| M-1 Challenge: Belarus
| 
| align=center|1
| align=center|1:58
| Brest, Belarus
| 
|-
| Loss
| align=center| 1–3 
| Vidmantas Tatarunas
| Decision (unanimous)
| Shooto Lithuania – King of Bushido Stage 2
| 
| align=center|2
| align=center|5:00
| Kaunas, Lithuania
| 
|-
| Loss
| align=center| 1–2 
| Nikolai Onikienko
| Decision (unanimous)
| WAFC – CIS Cup 2003
| 
| align=center|
| align=center|
| Yaroslavl, Russia
| 
|-
| Loss
| align=center| 1–1
| Telman Piraev
| N/A
| IAFC – Vasily Kudin Memorial 2002
| 
| align=center|
| align=center|
| Stakhanov, Ukraine
| 
|-
| Win
| align=center| 1–0 
| Dmitry Surnev
| TKO (cut)
| IAFC – Vasily Kudin Memorial 2002
| 
| align=center|
| align=center|
| Stakhanov, Ukraine
| MMA debout.

Muay Thai and kickboxing record

|-
|-  bgcolor="#c5d2ea"
| 2011-09-12 || Draw ||align=left| Zamig Athakishiyev || «Battle Show» 2011 || Minsk, Belarus || Decision || 4 || 3:00
|-  bgcolor="#FFBBBB"
| 2011-02-12 || Loss ||align=left| Goran Radonjić || W5 League || Moscow, Russia || Ext.R.Decision || 4 || 3:00
|-  bgcolor="#FFBBBB"
| 2010-12-16 ||Loss ||align=left| Pavel Zhuravlev || KOK World GP 2010 in Moscow, final || Odintsovo, Russia || 2 Ext. R Decision (Split) || 5 || 3:00 
|-
! style=background:white colspan=9 |
|-
|-  bgcolor="#CCFFCC"
| 2010-12-16 ||Win ||align=left| Hyun Man Myung || KOK World GP 2010 in Moscow, semi finals || Odintsovo, Russia || KO (Left Hook) || 3 || 0:31
|-
|-  bgcolor="#CCFFCC"
| 2010-12-16 ||Win ||align=left| Vugar Javadov || KOK World GP 2010 in Moscow, quarter finals || Odintsovo, Russia || RTD || 2 || 1:33 
|-
|-  bgcolor="#CCFFCC"
| 2010-07-30 || Win ||align=left| Sergei Lascenko || Fight Club "The Octopus" || Minsk, Belarus || Decision (unanimous) || 3 || 3:00
|-  bgcolor="#c5d2ea"
| 2010-04-17 || Draw ||align=left| Pavel Zhuravlev || Big8 Grand Prix "European Selection" || Kharkiv, Ukraine || Decision draw || 3 || 3:00 
|-  bgcolor="#FFBBBB"
| 2009-03-26 || Loss ||align=left| Pavel Zhuravlev || WBKF World Tournament (+93 kg) @ Club Arbat, semi finals || Moscow, Russia || Decision (Unanimous) || 3 || 3:00 
|-  bgcolor="#FFBBBB"
| 2008-10-30 || Loss||align=left| Pavel Zhuravlev || WBKF European Tournament (+93 kg) @ Club Arbat, final || Moscow, Russia || Decision (Majority) || 3 || 3:00 
|-
! style=background:white colspan=9 |
|-
|-  bgcolor="#CCFFCC"
| 2008-10-30 || Win||align=left| Stanislav Belokon || WBKF European Tournament (+93 kg) @ Club Arbat, semi finals || Moscow, Russia || KO || 3 || 
|-
|-  bgcolor="#FFBBBB"
| 2008-05-29 || Loss ||align=left| Pavel Zhuravlev || WBKF World Tournament (+93 kg) @ Club Arbat || Moscow, Russia || Decision (Split) || 3 || 3:00 
|-
! style=background:white colspan=9 |
|-
|-  bgcolor="#CCFFCC"
| 2008-05-29 || Win ||align=left| Sergei Lascenko || WBKF World Tournament (+93 kg) @ Club Arbat, semi finals || Moscow, Russia || Decision (unanimous) || 3 || 3:00
|-  bgcolor="#CCFFCC"
| 2007-10-27 || Win ||align=left| Tomáš Hron || Angels of Fire II ||  || Decision (Unanimous) || 3 || 3:00
|-  bgcolor="#CCFFCC"
| 2007-04-18 || Win ||align=left| Suren Kalachyan || WBKF European Tournament (+93 kg) @ Club Arbat, final || Moscow, Russia || Decision (Unanimous) || 3 || 3:00 
|-
! style=background:white colspan=9 |
|-
|-  bgcolor="#CCFFCC"
| 2007-04-18 || Win ||align=left| Pavel Zhuravlev || WBKF European Tournament (+93 kg) @ Club Arbat, semi finals || Moscow, Russia || Decision (Split) || 3 || 3:00 
|-  bgcolor="#CCFFCC"
| 2007-01-17 || Win ||align=left| Oleg Zdragush || Fight Club Arbat || Moscow, Russia || Decision (Unanimous) || 3 || 3:00 
|-  bgcolor="#CCFFCC"
| 2006-12-20 || Win ||align=left| Andrey Zuravkov || WBKF World Tournament (+93 kg) @ Club Arbat, super fight || Moscow, Russia || TKO || 3 || 
|-  bgcolor="#FFBBBB"
| 2006-07-19 || Loss ||align=left| Sergei Gur || Fight Club Arbat || Moscow, Russia || Decision (Split) || 5 || 3:00 
|-
! style=background:white colspan=9 |
|-
|-  bgcolor="#CCFFCC"
| 2006-04-26 || Win ||align=left| Suren Kalachyan || Fight Club Arbat || Moscow, Russia || Decision (Unanimous) || 3 || 3:00
|-  bgcolor="#CCFFCC"
| 2006-02-01 || Win ||align=left| Denis Podolyachin || Fight Club Arbat || Moscow, Russia || KO || 1 || 
|-  bgcolor="#CCFFCC"
| 2005-10-12 || Win ||align=left| Telman Sherifov || Fight Club Arbat || Moscow, Russia || TKO || 3 || 
|-  bgcolor="#FFBBBB"
| 2005-07-13 || Loss ||align=left| Zabit Samedov || Fight Club Arbat || Moscow, Russia || TKO || 4 || 
|-  bgcolor="#CCFFCC"
| 2005-03-30 || Win ||align=left| Artem Yashnov || Fight Club Arbat || Moscow, Russia || KO || 1 || 
|-  bgcolor="#CCFFCC"
| 2004-08-25 || Win || || Fight Club Arbat || Moscow, Russia || KO || 4 || 
|-  bgcolor="#CCFFCC"
| 2004-07-07 || Win ||align=left| Vladimir Marinin || Fight Club Arbat || Moscow, Russia || TKO || 2 || 
|-  bgcolor="#CCFFCC"
| 2004-05-26 || Win ||align=left| Maxim Neledva || Fight Club Arbat || Moscow, Russia || TKO || 3 || 
|-

|-
|-  bgcolor="#FFBBBB"
| 2013-10 || Loss ||align=left| Abdarhmane Coulibaly || W.A.K.O World Championships 2013, K-1 Final +91 kg  || Guaruja, Brasil ||  ||  || 
|-
! style=background:white colspan=9 |
|-
|-  bgcolor="#CCFFCC"
| 2013-10 || Win ||align=left| Nadir Gadzhiev || W.A.K.O World Championships 2013, K-1 Semi Finals +91 kg  || Guaruja, Brasil ||  ||  || 
|-
|-  bgcolor="#CCFFCC"
| 2013-10 || Win ||align=left| Mika Maliefulu || W.A.K.O World Championships 2013, K-1 Quarter Finals +91 kg  || Guaruja, Brasil ||  ||  || 
|-
|-  bgcolor="#CCFFCC"
| 2013-10 || Win ||align=left| Harry Nana Kwasi Ferguson Maxwill || W.A.K.O World Championships 2013, K-1 1st Round +91 kg  || Guaruja, Brasil ||  ||  || 

|-  style="background:#fbb;"
| 2012-05-|| Loss ||align=left| Tsotne Rogava || IFMA European Championship 2012, Final || Antalya, Turkey || Decision  || 4 || 2:00 
|-
! style=background:white colspan=9 |

|-  bgcolor="#CCFFCC"
| 2010-10 || Win ||align=left| Alex Rossi || W.A.K.O European Championships 2010, K-1 Final +91 kg || Baku, Azerbaijan ||  ||  || 
|-
! style=background:white colspan=9 |
|-
|-  bgcolor="#CCFFCC"
| 2010-10 || Win ||align=left| Volodymyr Oliynyk || W.A.K.O European Championships 2010, K-1 Semi Finals +91 kg  || Baku, Azerbaijan ||  ||  ||
|-  bgcolor="#CCFFCC"
| 2010-10 || Win ||align=left| Dane Bokan || W.A.K.O European Championships 2010, K-1 Quarter Finals +91 kg  || Baku, Azerbaijan || Decision (Split) || 3 ||2:00

|-
|-  bgcolor="#fbb"
| 2010-12- || Loss ||align=left| Filip Verlinden || 2010 IFMA World Championships, Semi Finals || Bangkok, Thailand || Decision || 4 || 2:00
|-
! style=background:white colspan=9 |

|-  bgcolor="#CCFFCC"
| 2009-10 || Win ||align=left| Guto Inocente || W.A.K.O World Championships 2009, K-1 Final + 91 kg kg || Villach, Austria ||  ||  || 
|-
! style=background:white colspan=9 |
|-
|-  bgcolor="#CCFFCC"
| 2009-10 || Win ||align=left| Alexei Papin || W.A.K.O World Championships 2009, K-1 Semi Finals + 91 kg kg || Villach, Austria ||  ||  || 
|-
|-  bgcolor="#CCFFCC"
| 2009-10 || Win ||align=left| Frank Muñoz || W.A.K.O World Championships 2009, K-1 1/4 Finals + 91 kg kg || Villach, Austria ||  ||  || 
|-
|-  bgcolor="#CCFFCC"
| 2007-09-30 || Win ||align=left| Dzhamal Kasumov || W.A.K.O World Championships 2007, K-1 Rules Final +91 kg || Belgrade, Serbia || || ||
|-
! style=background:white colspan=9 |
|-
|-  bgcolor="#CCFFCC"
| 2007-09-? || Win ||align=left| Mirko Vlahović || W.A.K.O World Championships 2007, K-1 Rules Semi Finals +91 kg || Belgrade, Serbia || || ||
|-
|-  bgcolor="#CCFFCC"
| 2007-09-? || Win ||align=left| Igor Kolacin || W.A.K.O World Championships 2007, K-1 Rules Quarter Finals +91 kg || Belgrade, Serbia || || ||
|-
|-  bgcolor="#CCFFCC"
| 2006-11 || Win ||align=left| Valentino Venturini || W.A.K.O European Championships 2006, Thai-Boxing Rules Final +91 kg || Skopje, Macedonia ||KO || ||
|-
! style=background:white colspan=9 |
|-
|-  bgcolor="#CCFFCC"
| 2006-11 || Win ||align=left| Mladen Božić || W.A.K.O European Championships 2006, Thai-Boxing Rules Semi Finals +91 kg || Skopje, Macedonia || || ||
|-
|-  bgcolor="#CCFFCC"
| 2006-11 || Win ||align=left| Jasmin Bečirović || W.A.K.O European Championships 2006, Thai-Boxing Rules Quarter Finals +91 kg || Skopje, Macedonia || Decision (Unanimous)|| ||
|-
|-
| colspan=9 | Legend:

See also

List of WAKO Amateur World Championships
List of WAKO Amateur European Championships
List of K-1 events
List of male kickboxers

References

Belarusian male kickboxers
Heavyweight kickboxers
Belarusian male mixed martial artists
Mixed martial artists utilizing Muay Thai
Mixed martial artists utilizing kickboxing
Belarusian Muay Thai practitioners
Sportspeople from Minsk
1984 births
Living people